Kim Se-yol (Korean: 김세열; born February 5, 1973) is a South Korean former competitive figure skater. He competed at the 1992 World Championships and finished 31st.

Following his retirement from competitive skating, he became a coach and choreographer. Among his current and former students are Lee Kyu-hyun, Kim Yuna, and Lee Dong-whun.

Competitive highlights

References

External links
 Figure skating corner: 1992 Worlds results

1973 births
Living people
South Korean male single skaters
Figure skating coaches
Competitors at the 1997 Winter Universiade